The Watertown Public Opinion is published in Watertown, South Dakota, United States, serving eastern South Dakota and western Minnesota. The fourth largest newspaper in South Dakota publishes in the afternoon, Tuesday through Friday.

History 
Founded two years before South Dakota statehood, the Public Opinion in its first 110 years had a succession of local owners, including Stitzel X. Way, whose family ran it for 94 years before selling to Kenosha WI based United Communications Corporation (UCC) March 1, 2002.  

In 2016, it was sold by United Communications to Schurz Communications out of South Bend, IN. It was sold again in 2019 to GateHouse Media.

References

External links 
 

Newspapers published in South Dakota
Codington County, South Dakota
Watertown, South Dakota
Gannett publications